Mount Ramon is a mountain in the Negev desert in Israel, near the Egyptian border and west of the well-known Ramon Crater.

It is the highest mountain in Southern District (Israel).

Mountains of Israel